Niyi Towolawi is a British filmmaker and writer/director of TWisTED  and Turning Point. He is one of the leading filmmakers introducing the Nollywood audience to international cinema, with films of high production values.

Early life 
Towolawi is of Yoruba, Nigerian descent, and grew up in Canning Town, east London. He is a Mathematics graduate from the University of Manchester, where he played basketball, studied Shaolin Kung fu , and was popular on campus for his somewhat eccentric personality and soul-train dance moves. He has always been a keen jazz musician and plays numerous musical instruments.

Career

Before films 
He began producing music in high school and had a number of white labels releases at the height of the UK Garage scene, and worked with notable artistes including a pre-stardom D'Banj, published under HekCentrik Music. He worked as a software developer, headhunted by some of the world's leading organisations, after graduating from university, where he continued producing music and shooting numerous music videos, in a cinematic style that evolved into making feature films.

Technology 
He has been at the forefront of the digital cinematography revolution since 2005 shooting then with 35mm adapters on camcorders, a D-I-Y approach that pre-dates the digital cinema cameras and video DSLR generation of today. His film, "TWisTED" was one of the first to project digitally when it premiered at Odeon, Surrey Quays, in 2007 with support from the UK Film Council.

Themes 
His films center around people of African origin in the Diaspora. His plotlines explore elements of multi-dimensional relationships along ethnic, gender, or taboo issues, and often feature characters of subjective motives. He lists Ridley Scott as his all-time favourite director.

Filmography 
 Turning Point (2012)
 TWisTED (2007)
The Miracle Centre (2020)

References

External links 
 
 Company page

Living people
Film directors from London
English people of Yoruba descent
Alumni of the University of Manchester
Yoruba filmmakers
People from Canning Town
Year of birth missing (living people)